Volleyball at the 1972 Summer Olympics was represented by two events: men's team and women's team.

Medal table

Medal summary

References

External links
Todor66

 
1972 Summer Olympics events
O
1972
International volleyball competitions hosted by West Germany